Ashta Bhairavas ("Eight Bhairavas") are eight manifestations of the Hindu god Bhairava, a ferocious aspect of the god Shiva. They guard and control the eight directions. Each Bhairava has seven sub Bhairavas under him. All of the Bhairavas are ruled and controlled by Maha Kala Bhairava (shown in picture), who is considered the supreme ruler of time of the universe and the chief form of Bhairava.

Listed below are the Ashta Bhairava, along with their ruling goddesses, their vahana (mount), and the direction each guards. Also given are their lucky stones, and the consecrated temples in Tamil Nadu, India,  where people born on the listed nakshatras get the Ashta Bhairava’s favours and Dosha Nivritti (remedies for problems).

The Ashta Bhairavas, all 8 of them, can be seen at Kashi Vishwanath Temple, Sattainathar Temple, Sirkazhi & Aragalur Sri Kamanada Eswar Temple, Shri Mahabairavar Rudra Aalayam, Chengalpattu.

Asithanga Bhairava

This form is white complexioned and has four arms. In his four hands, he holds the rosary, kamandal, sword and skull cup.

 Ruling goddess/Consort: Brahmani
 Vahana: Swan
 Direction: East
 Temple: Sattanathar Temple, Sirkazhi and Brahma Sira Kandeeswarar Temple, Thirukandiyur.
 Nakshatram/ Birth Star: Punarpoosam, Visakam, Purattadhi
 Stone:  Yellow Sapphire
Ruling God : Brahma
Governs graha : Guru (Jupiter)

Ruru Bhairava

This form is light blue complexioned and has four arms. In his four arms he holds the deer, axe, sword and bowl.

 Ruling goddess/Consort: Maheshvari
 Vahana: Ox
 Direction: Southeast 
 Temple: Rathnagiriswarar Temple, Thirumarugal
 Nakshatram/ Birth Star: Karthikai, Uthiradam, Uthiram
 Stone: Ruby
 Ruling god : Shiva
 Governs Graha: Shukra (Venus)

Chanda Bhairava

This form is fair complexioned and has four arms. The bow, arrow, sword and bowl are held in these arms.

 Ruling goddess/Consort: Kaumari
 Vahana: Peacock
 Direction: South
 Temple: Vaitheeswaran Koil
 Nakshatram/ Birth Star: Mirugaseerisham, Chithirai, Avittam
 Stone: coral
 Governs Graha: Mangal (Mars)

Krodha Bhairava

This form is dark blue complexioned and has four arms in which he holds the conch, discus, mace and bowl.

 Ruling goddess/Consort: Vaishnavi
 Vahana: Eagle
 Direction: South-West
 Temple: Thiruvisanallur, Thirunaraiyur
 Nakshatram/ Birth Star: Rohini, Hastham, Thiruvonam
 Stone: Pearl
 Governs Graha: Shani (Saturn)

Unmatta Bhairava

This form is golden complexioned and has four arms in which he holds the sword, skull cup, pestle and shield.

 Ruling goddess/Consort: Jwala ji, Varahi
 Vahana: Horse
 Direction: West
 Temple: Thiruveezhimizhalai, Bilur, Amona
 Governs Graha: Budha (Mercury)

Kapala Bhairava

This form has a shining-yellow complexion and has four arms in which he holds the thunderbolt, noose, sword and bowl.

 Ruling goddess/Consort: Indrani
 Vahana: Elephant
 Direction: North-West
 Temple: Thiruvirkudi, Thirupanthuruthi
 Nakshatram/ Birth Star: Bharani, Pooram, Puradam
 Stone: Diamond
 Governs Graha: Chandra (Moon)

Bheeshana Bhairava

This form is blood-red complexioned and has four arms in which the sword, skull cup, trident and pestle are held.

 Ruling goddess/Consort: Chamunda
 Vahana: Lion
 Direction: North
 Temple: Rameswaram, Piranmalai
 Nakshatram/ Birth Star: Thiruvadhirai, Swati, Sadayam, Ashwini, Magha, Mula
 Governs Graha: Ketu

Samhara Bhairava

This form has a lightning-yellow-orange complexion and has ten arms in which he holds the trident, drum, conch, mace, discus, sword, bowl, skull-topped staff, noose and a goad.

 Ruling goddess/Consort: Chandi
 Vahana: Dog
 Direction: Northeast
 Temple: Thiruvenkadu, Kolli Malai, Vairavanpatti, Hosur
 Nakshatram/ Birth Star: Ayilyam, Ketai, Revathi
 Governs Planet: Rahu

References

External links

Forms of Shiva